A flange is a ridge, a rib or rim.

Flange may also refer to:
 Flanging, an audio effect
 Flanging, part of the process of blocking a felt hat
 Flange gasket, a type of gasket made to fit between two sections of pipe that are flared to provide higher surface area
 Marman clamp, a flange connection used in aerospace plumbing
 Vacuum flange, a flange used in connecting vacuum equipment
 Waveguide flange, a flange used in connecting microwave waveguides
 Flange Desire, a character on the Australian ABC comedy show, The Aunty Jack Show
 Some adult male orangutans develop cheek flaps called flanges

See also